The Copa de España de Futsal is an annual cup competition for Spanish futsal teams. It is organized by the Liga Nacional de Fútbol Sala and was founded in the season 1989–90. It is contested annually between the top eight teams in the league table as calculated at the midway point in season, in a neutral venue in different cities every year.

Season by season

Number of titles

Related competitions
 Primera División de Futsal
 Segunda División de Futsal
 Supercopa de España de Futsal
 Copa del Rey de Futsal

External links
Futsal at rfef.es
List of Champions

 
Futsal competitions in Spain
Spain
1990 establishments in Spain